Tumor necrosis factor-inducible gene 6 protein also known as TNF-stimulated gene 6 protein or TSG-6 is a protein that in humans is encoded by the TNFAIP6 (tumor necrosis factor, alpha-induced protein 6) gene.

Structure and function 

TSG-6 is a 30 kDa secreted protein that contains a hyaluronan-binding LINK domain a and thus is a member of the hyaluronan-binding protein family, also called hyaladherins. The hyaluronan-binding domain is known to be involved in extracellular matrix stability and cell migration. This protein has been shown to form a stable, covalent complex with inter-alpha-inhibitor (IαI), and thus enhance the serine protease inhibitory activity of IαI, which is important in the protease network associated with inflammation. The expression of this gene can be induced by a number of signalling molecules, principally tumor necrosis factor α (TNF-α) and interleukin-1 (IL-1). The expression can also be induced by mechanical stimuli in vascular smooth muscle cells, and is found to be correlated with proteoglycan synthesis and aggregation. TSG-6 has been shown to modulate macrophage plasticity and signal the transition of LPS-treated macrophages from pro- to anti-inflammatory phenotype.

TSG-6 also interacts with a number of matrix associated molecules such as aggrecan, versican, thrombospondin (1&2), pentraxin-3 and fibronectin.

References

Further reading